Želimir Altarac "Čičak" (21 August 1947 – 26 March 2021) was a Bosnian singer and songwriter from Sarajevo.

Early life
During this period he grew increasingly infatuated with Western rock music coming from the United States and the United Kingdom, which had gained a devoted audience among the youth of communist Yugoslavia. Teenage Čičak often skipped gym classes in pursuit of activities he was more interested in – organizing local rock gigs, writing and reciting poetry, moderating music events, and editing the gymnasium newsletter Polet. He developed a particular interest in the crossover between poetry and rock music, reciting his own poetry at different student manifestations over the coming years. Among such events from this period was a beatnik-like stage setup where upstart actors Etela Pardo and Branko Ličen recited Čičak's verses while musician Ranko Rihtman played the keyboard.

In the late sixties, the first underground club Barutana was taking shape in downtown Sarajevo, with Čičak participating from the beginning. Many later famous musicians of former Yugoslavia started their journey in Barutana in some sort of Bosnian/Yugoslavian "tower of songs". Čičak soon commenced a program "Čičak plus Čičak" (“Burdock Plus Burdock") where he and the band Čičak jointly performed. It was also in Barutana that Čičak made a step towards not only working with the music but rather working on music of his own. His cooperation with pop-rock group Kodeksi resulted in three chart successes according to the Sarajevo Radio Chart (the best media platform for progressive music waves at the time). He wrote lyrics for Eduard Bogeljić's song "Lutalica" and he also made a remake of two world hits: "To Love Somebody" by the Bee Gees and "Song of a Baker" by Small Faces.

DJ, journalist, and promoter
Čičak's collaboration with the rock group Indexi helped him to further sharpen his poetic expression in pop rock music. He wrote lyrics for their most famous songs such as: "Negdje na kraju u zatišju" (“Somewhere, at the end of a road, where everything goes down to silence”), and "Svijet u kome živim" (The World I live In). A truth seeking of "Negdje na kraju u zatišju" was published in Polet to be later musically arranged and tuned by Slobodan Bodo Kovačević of Indexi, who made a 12-minute-long song which starts and ends with recitation. It was a somewhat unusual and new form of musical expression at the time, but was very successful according to the Radio Sarajevo Music Chart. Čičak also later wrote "Povratak Jacka Trbosjeka" (Return of Jack the Ripper) for Indexi. 
Besides his experiences with Barutana and collaboration with Indexi, Čičak was a winner of a European competition of DJs in the Istrian city of Rovinj. He showed a great interest in working as a music radio host, and his journey to achieving this started in 1974 at Radio Sarajevo. Here he initially hosted Pop Orion and then Attention please, mind the Dynamite on the Vinyl, Ballads in the shadow of skyscrapers, and Joyful Electronics. When Radio Sarajevo started its late night programme in 1981, Čičak was among the few to jump in. He helped Radio Sarajevo with his spirit, but he was also helped by them to make his name in the music realm of Yugoslavia. His late night program started with a show called Discothèque at 2:30, which was an introduction into Charade of acoustic, which thousands of people from Slovenia to Macedonia tuned into during the prime time between 4.30 p.m. and 6.00 p.m.

He soon started another adventure by traveling to different places within former Yugoslavia with his "flying" discothèque called Top Rock Disco Show. The positive perception of music critics and thousands of listeners encouraged Čičak to undertake yet another endeavor – to discover and promote of new rising stars. From 1977 to 1982 at the Sloga cultural club, in downtown Sarajevo, Čičak paved the way for a new generation of rock musicians to show their talent. Talented young musicians and rock groups to be, from those garage bands to the school ones, were dreaming of having an opportunity to present themselves at Sloga. Those who were proven to be the best did really get the opportunity – including Žaoka (Sting), Flota (Fleet), Top (Canon), Kako had, Mali print (Small Prince), Rock Apoteka (Rock Pharmacy), Tina, Ozbiljno Pitanje (A Serious Question), Linija života (Life Line), Posljednji autobus (The Last Bus), Lucifer, and Velika Porodica (The Big Family). This healthy competition of its own had helped forging new domestic pop rock concepts and shaped up later to be among the biggest pop-rock bands in the former Yugoslavia – Zabranjeno Pušenje, Plavi orkestar, Crvena jabuka, Bombaj Štampa, Valentino, Gino Banana, and singer Mladen Vojičić Tifa...They had also opened the door of fame to somewhat at the time smaller bands who just later gained their momentum of fame- Vatreni Poljubac, Divlje jagode, Film, Buldožer, Galija...

Čičak continued to spread new narratives and discover new territories. At Đuro Đaković Workers' University Amphitheatre, from 1977 to 1980, he was organizing lectures about the world and domestic trends in pop rock music. As a journalist and music critic, Čičak was publishing articles and editorials in almost all leading newspapers and magazines in Sarajevo and former Yugoslavia – VEN, Večernje novine, Svijet, Oslobođenje, Džuboks, and Rock.

The year 1984 has particular significance in Čičak's career. In back then Olympic metropolis of the world (that was the year of the Fourteenth Olympic Winter Games in Sarajevo), Čičak took over the editorial stick at the so-called Youth Centre Skenderija (Dom Mladih) where he was relentlessly working from 1984 to 1992 His name was well known, his experience undisputed and Sarajevo as relatively small town and very vivid music scene in comparison to Zagreb and Belgrade was ready for its "five minutes" of fame as a cultural capital of the former Yugoslavia. It was at Dom Mladih where Čičak first organised traditional music manifestation of wider significance: “Yu heavy metal fest" (1986-1991) i "Festival of pop-rock bands of BIH – significant newcomers" or in native language "Nove nade nove snage" (Dom mladih 1984–1992). For all those who happen to even superficially know the pop rock scene of the former Yugoslavia names such as: Dino Merlin, Hari Mata Hari, Konvoj (Convoy), Regina (Bosnia and Herzegovina band), Letu štuke, Protest (Demonstration), Knock Out (Apokalipsa), Rupa u zidu – (Damir Avdić Diplomatz) can be enough argument for understanding a role a Youth Centre and Čičak were playing in modern music history of Sarajevo, BiH and region. All of them started their very successful careers at Čičak's Festival "Significant Newcomers".

Rock marathons (1979, 1984, 1989)
A really special place and meaning in Želimir Altarac Čičak's entire career belong to Rock Marathons organized under the banner: "Ž.A. Čičak – with a little help from my friends".  Every five years, exactly on his working jubilee, Čičak was organizing ten hours long program with all musicians from former Yugoslavia who either started off with his help or who appreciated in a particular way his contribution to the profession. The first one was organised at the Youth Center at Skenderija on January 18, 1979, where many friends showed up, most of whom genuine representatives of Sarajevo music school: Indexi, Vatreni Poljubac, Divlje jagode, Cod, Formula 4, Jadranka Stojaković, Slobodan Samardžić & Narcis Vučina... 
The second one took place on November 24, 1984, in overcrowded Skenderija where, now famous veterans, Indexi played their hits alongside renowned pop-rock bands: Bajaga I Instruktori, U škripcu, Slomljena Stakla, Elvis J. Kurtovich, Kongres, Gino banana, Leb i sol, Laboratorija Zvuka, Drugi način, Galija, Vatreni Poljubac, Teška Industrija, Resonance, Formula 4...
The third and the most spectacular one by far took place at the biggest hall in Sarajevo "Zetra" on October 14, 1989. Throughout a ten hours program almost all relevant musicians on former Yugoslavia showed up – from Indexi and Riblja Čorba to Atomsko sklonište, YU Grupa, Galija, Vatreni Poljubac, Jura Stublić i Film, Le cinema, Zabranjeno Pušenje, Psihomodo Pop, Hari Mata Hari, Tifa Band, Formula 4, Bambinosi, Rusija, Konvoj... Especially, need to emphasize that all participants of his jubilee concerts that includes champions of pop pock music and new names of BiH and former Yugoslav scene, played their music for free as a sign of successful cooperation in many years.

Wartime

Čičak rediscovered his own way to fight against the gloomy days of besieged and suffocated Sarajevo. He continued organizing concerts at Sloga and hosting many radio shows when there was electricity to allow them to be broadcast. From 1993 to 1995 in Sarajevo's radio station The Wall, he was editor and host of show Rock 'n' roll radio, that he called, thanks to blackouts in those years, Accumulator Radio. Still, in polls among listeners, it was the most listened radio show in those years. Same thing happened with his TV Show on NTV 99 Above the Clouds (1996–1997). He was the organizer of the first rock concert during the war (March 23, 1993) at Chamber Theater 55, entitled Give Peace a Chance, that gathered all musicians who stayed in war-torn Sarajevo. A special event was a concert of Joan Baez on April 14, 1993, in the cinema hall Imperial, that attracted attention of world media.

U2 concert, football match between Bosnian and Italian singers, Deep Purple

From 2006 onwards, every Friday from 4.30 p.m. to 6.00 p.m. Cicak hosted the radio show Izvan Vremena (Out of Time) on the so-called Open Network. This was composed of many networked radio stations in BiH who simultaneously broadcast the same show, thus enhancing coverage to all corners of the country. 
As he had helped Indexi to emerge as one of the most significant Yu rock bands, with the same passion and dedication he worked on their comeback immediately after the War. Čičak organised their first comeback concert at the Bosnian Cultural Centre, downtown Sarajevo, February 2 and 3 1996. He was the organizer of the concert "Rock no War", of the Italian star Paolo Belli in Sloga club on March 17, 1996, and as a promoter, he participated in organizing the biggest spectacle held in Sarajevo, a concert of the Irish rock stars U2 held September 23, 1997 at Koševo stadium. He organized and promoted the musical and sport spectacle “Meeting of Harts”, the first football match between singers squads od Italia and BiH October 19, 1998 at Grbavica stadium, as well as a concert of the legendary band Deep Purple at the biggest hall in Sarajevo Zetra, November 3, 2007. And another concert was of famous Joan Baez in traditional manifestation Baščaršija Nights (Baščaršijske noći) July 16, 2008. He was organizer of numerous visits from BiH to concerts of world music stars in neighbouring states, what main theme of song “With Čičak on Stones” of band Zabranjeno Pušenje on their album Agent tajne sile (Agent of Foreign force) in 1999. Until 1983 he was a free artist, and from that year until 1994 he was the organizer of musical programs at the Youth Center in Sarajevo (Dom Mladih Sarajevo). From 1994 to 2007 he worked in news agency BIH PRESS, that later became Federal News agency FENA, as a promoter, journalist and editor in chief of e-magazine for culture BIH KULT. He published book "Antique Shop of Dreams“, an autobiography/monography as participant of rise of Sarajevo, bh and ex-yu rock-pop scene from the beginning of the sixties until recent days. Promotion of book was 25 November 2017. On First trade fair of book publishers "Books in shelves"  after that, book had a concert promotion in Sarajevo music hall Dom mladih under title "friendship out of time for all times" where as guests performed some of his associates from past decades without any fees. He received numerous recognitions for his work.

Gallery

Awards
City of Sarajevo 6th of April Award from 1980. (Spomen placenta grade Sarajevo 06. april 1980.)
The Gold Medal of Labour from 1983.by the Presidency of BiH ( Zlatna Medalja rada ( 1983.-Predsjedništvo SFRJ)
The Art Award of BIH from 1990. (1990.–Savez Udruženja Estradnih Radnika SRBIH)
The Golden Lilly of the Sarajevo -Center County from 1996. (Zlatni Ljiljan 1996. – Općina Centar Sarajevo), 
Davorin 2005 – The special award for affirmation of pop-rock culture (Posebna Nagrada za Afirmaciju BiH pop-rock culture)

About Želimir Altarac Čičak in various literature, lexicons etc.
Antique Shop of Dreams ( Antikvarnica snova) autobiography/monography – Želimir Altarac Čičak, Sarajevo: publishing house Dobra kniga – 
Biography Lexicon of Who is Who in BiH 2014.-2018,Tešanj(pp. 29–30): Publishing House Planjax Commerc – 
Indexi – in despise to years: a documentary biography in four parts, Dujmović, Josip, Zenica: publishing house The Library of Zenica, 2016., pp. 17,116,125,126,131,133,135,141,162,163,164,231,249,260,301,302,333,334,335,346.
Sarajevo my City 6– A Virtuoso on Guitar and Romantic, Sarajevo: Publishing House Rabic, 2016. , pp. 153-160.
A closing time in Sarajevo, Janković, Nenad alias Dr. Nele Karajlić, Beograd: publishing house Laguna  and Novosti a.d., 2014. , pp. 125,126,127,130.
If you were me, Vesić, Dušan, Zagreb: publishing house Ljevak, d.o.o., 2014. , pp. 08,30,199
Sarajevo My City 3- One of those days – Sloga of our youth, Sarajevo: publishing house Rabic, 2014. , pp.193-201. 
Indexi – In despise to years-a biography of Indexi, Dujmović, Josip, Sarajevo: publishing house Quattro Media, 2006., pp. 8, 101, 102, 108, 109, 114, 116, 117, 125, 140, 148, 183, 184, 193, 207, 215, 244, 249, 250. 
Indexi – In despise to years- Photo Monography, Dujmović, Josip:, Sarajevo: publishing house Quattro Media Sarajevo, 2006., – pp. 7,61,67,101,110,114,135,142,161,171,227 
When the rock was young, Škarica Siniša, Zagreb: publishing house V.B.Z. Zagreb, 2005., pp. 142, 177
The first BH pop-rock lexicon, Misirlić, Amir, publishing house Hercegtisak, 2004., pp. 2, 13, 46, 59, 77, 81, 106, 115, 151. 
Ex Yu rock enciklopedija 1960–2006, Janjatović, Petar, Beograd:publishing house Čigoja štampa 2007. , p. 105 
Lexicon of Yu Mithology, Beograd Publishing houses Rende, Postscriptum, 2004. (National Library Belgrad ), Nacional Library Zagreb ), pp. 96, 248 
Music-Importance and Development of Sarajevo Pop Rock Scene, Sarajevo: Music Academy, 1997 – pp. 137,138,139,140,141 
Significance And Development Of The Sarajevo Pop Rock Music Scene, Sarajevo: AINFSN, pub. AVICENA, – Open Society Soros Sarajevo,1994. Nr.647, pp. 143,144,145,146,147. 
Sarajevo War Drama – The second part, Miličević, Hrvoje, Sarajevo:1993. Pp. 143,144,145.

References

External links

You Tube channel
Facebook profile
Web site

1947 births
2021 deaths
Writers from Sarajevo
Yugoslav journalists
Bosnia and Herzegovina journalists
Bosnia and Herzegovina DJs
Music industry executives
Music promoters
Deaths from the COVID-19 pandemic in Bosnia and Herzegovina